Karne L. Hesketh (born 1 August 1985) is a player for the Japan rugby union team.

Early life

Hesketh was born in Napier, New Zealand, where he attended Napier Boys High School.

Professional career

Hesketh is a professional rugby union player who plays wing for Fukuoka Sanix Blues since 2010. Since 2014, he also plays internationally for Japan.

In what is regarded as one of the greatest upsets ever in Rugby World Cup history, and possibly one of the most famous victories in the history of sport, Hesketh with 84 minutes on the clock and with the last play of the game scored the winning try for Japan against South Africa in a 34–32 victory in the 2015 Rugby World Cup.

Afterward, he spoke of his immense pride at this victory of the Japanese national rugby team and celebrated with his teammates.

Personal life

His partner, Carla Hohepa, is a female New Zealand rugby union player who plays as a wing for New Zealand, Otago Spirit and Alhambra Union.

References

1985 births
Living people
Japanese rugby union players
Japan international rugby union players
Rugby union players from Napier, New Zealand
Otago rugby union players
Munakata Sanix Blues players
New Zealand expatriate sportspeople in Japan
People educated at Napier Boys' High School
Rugby union centres
Rugby union wings